Greatest Hits, Vol. 1 is the first compilation album by American country music artist Phil Vassar, released on May 2, 2006. This was Vassar's most popular album, along with being his final album for Arista Nashville, it consists of songs from Vassar's first three records: 2000's Phil Vassar, 2002's American Child, and 2004's Shaken Not Stirred. Also included are his own versions of songs that he wrote for other country music artists before beginning his solo singing career: "Bye, Bye" and "I'm Alright" (previously recorded by Jo Dee Messina), "For a Little While" and "My Next Thirty Years" (previously recorded by Tim McGraw) and "Little Red Rodeo" (previously recorded by Collin Raye). Three newly recorded songs — "Twenty One", "Last Day of My Life", and "The Woman in My Life" — are also included on this compilation. The latter two were released as singles, peaking at #2 and #20, respectively, on the Billboard Hot Country Songs charts.

Greatest Hits, Vol. 1 was re-released in 2011 as Playlist: The Very Best of Phil Vassar.  Both albums have an identical track listing.

Track listing

Personnel on New Tracks
 Jim "Moose" Brown - keyboards, Hammond organ
 Steven J. Caldwell - drums
 Chad Cromwell - drums
 Eric Darken - percussion
 Larry Franklin - fiddle
 David Grissom - acoustic guitar, electric guitar
 Aubrey Haynie - fiddle
 Russ Pahl - banjo, 12-string guitar, electric guitar, steel guitar
 Clayton Ryder - accordion, Hammond organ
 Jeff Smith - electric guitar, background vocals 
 Bryan Sutton - acoustic guitar, mandolin
 Phil Vassar - piano, lead vocals, background vocals
 Glenn Worf - bass guitar

Charts

Weekly charts

Year-end charts

References

2006 greatest hits albums
Phil Vassar albums
Arista Records compilation albums